Uptown Conversation is the second album led by the jazz double bass player Ron Carter, recorded in 1969 and first released on the Embryo label.

Reception

The Allmusic review by Michael G. Nastos said, "Ron Carter's Uptown Conversation may very well be the most intriguing, challenging, and resonant statement of many he has made over the years as a leader ...Considering the music Ron Carter played preceding and following this effort, you'd be hard-pressed to find a more diverse, intellectually stimulating, enlivened, and especially unrestricted musical statement in his long and enduring career."

Track listing
All compositions by Ron Carter
 "Uptown Conversation" - 6:06
 "Ten Strings" - 5:35
 "Half a Row" - 10:13
 "R.J." - 2:46
 "Little Waltz" - 8:29
 "Einbahnstrasse" (aka First trip) - 8:04 	
 "Doom" - 7:07 	
 "Einbahnstrasse" [Alternate Take] - 7:15 Bonus track on CD reissue
 "Doom" [Alternate Take] - 6:34 Bonus track on CD reissue

Personnel
 Ron Carter  —  electric bass, double bass 
Hubert Laws  —  flute (tracks 1, 4 & 5)
 Herbie Hancock  —  piano, electric piano (all tracks except 2)
 Sam Brown  —  guitar (tracks 1, 2 & 4) 
 Grady Tate (tracks 1, 4 & 5), Billy Cobham (tracks 3, 6, & 7)  —  drums

References

Embryo Records albums
Ron Carter albums
1970 albums